This list of rivers of Ponce consists of the 14 rivers in the municipality of Ponce, Puerto Rico. Rivers that either originate in the municipality or that run the bulk of their course through said municipality are listed. Except for two rivers, Río Portugués and Río Jacaguas, all other rivers originate and terminate within the boundaries of the municipality of Ponce. This list does not include quebradas (English: brooks). Only streams recognized as "rivers" by the United States Geological Survey and the Puerto Rico Department of Natural and Environmental Resources are included here.

All the rivers in the municipality of Ponce run into one of four river basins that then empty into the Caribbean Sea. These four river basins are: Río Matilde, Río Bucaná, Río Inabón, and Río Jacaguas.

Río Pastillo and Río Canas merge to form Río Matilde.  Río Blanco, Río Prieto, Río San Patricio, Río Bayagán, Río Cerrillos, Río Chiquito, and Río Portugués all run in one manner or other into Río Bucaná.  Río Anon feeds into Río Inabón (Río Guayo also feeds into Río Inabón, but Río Guayo is not located in the municipality of Ponce).  Río Jacaguas is actually shared between the municipalities of Ponce and Juana Díaz, as it forms the boundary between the two municipalities. Various rivers feed into Río Jacaguas, but none of them are located within the municipality of Ponce.

Two rivers, Río Bucaná and Río Portugués, are partially canalized. These canalization occur in parts of the urban area of the city of Ponce.  Additionally, two rivers have been dammed: Río Cerrillos was dammed to create the Cerrillos Lake, and the damming of Río Portugués is expected to create the Portugués Lake when the project is completed in 2013. The damming of Río Cerrillos occurred north of the point where Río Bayagán feeds into Río Cerrillos but south of where Río San Patricio feeds into Río Cerrillos.

River list summary table

[*] = When the watershed area for a river appears as "Not Applicable", the river is itself part of another river's watershed area.

Listed alphabetically

 Río Anón
 Río Bayagán
 Río Blanco
 Río Bucaná
 Río Canas
 Río Cerrillos
 Río Chiquito
 Río Inabón
 Río Jacaguas
 Río Matilde
 Río Pastillo
 Río Portugués
 Río Prieto
 Río San Patricio

Listed from west to east

Listed according to the latitude at the mouth of the river: 
 Río Pastillo - at 66.6404508 W
 Río Canas - at 66.6404508 W
 Río Chiquito - at 66.6135062 W
 Río Blanco - at 66.6079505 W
 Río Prieto - at 66.6079505 W
 Río San Patricio - at 66.6068395 W
 Río Bucaná - at 66.5998946 W
 Río Bayagán - at 66.5857282 W
 Río Matilde - at 66.5798949 W
 Río Portugués - at 66.5798949 W
 Río Anón - at 66.5798949 W
 Río Cerrillos - at 66.5798949 W
 Río Inabón - at 66.5582270 W
 Río Jacaguas - at 66.5393380 W

Listed from south to north

This lists the rivers in order of their longitude or, roughly, where the river's mouth is relative to the Ponce shore:

0 km from shore (mouth at Caribbean Sea)
 Río Matilde
 Río Bucaná
 Río Inabón
 Río Jacaguas

Up to 1 km from shore
 Río Pastillo - at 18.0019106 N
 Río Canas - at 18.0019106 N
 Río Chiquito - at 18.0330201 N
 Río Bayagán - at 18.0435751 N

Up to 2 km from shore
 Río San Patricio - at 18.1177384 N
 Río Portugués - at 18.1319046 N
 Río Anón - at 18.1319046 N
 Río Cerrillos - at 18.1319046 N

Up to 3 km from shore
 Río Blanco - at 18.1438485 N
 Río Prieto - at 18.1438485 N

See also

 List of rivers of Puerto Rico

References

Further reading
 Fay Fowlie de Flores. Ponce, Perla del Sur: Una Bibliográfica Anotada. Second Edition. 1997. Ponce, Puerto Rico: Universidad de Puerto Rico en Ponce. p. 193. Item 993. 
 United States. Ponce Regional Water Resources Management Study. Washington, D.C.: s.n. 1974.  (PUCPR)

External links

 Geology and Hydrogeology of the Caribbean Islands Aquifer System of the Commonwealth of Puerto Rico and the U.S. Virgin Islands: Regional Aquifer-System Analysis. ROBERT A. RENKEN, W.C. WARD, I.P. GILL, FERNANDO GÓMEZ-GÓMEZ, JESÚS RODRÍGUEZ-MARTÍNEZ, et al. USGS. Professional Paper 1419. Reston, Virginia. 2002. Accessed 13 November 2019.
 USGS Geographic Names Information Service
 USGS Hydrologic Unit Map – Caribbean Region (1974)
 Los Rios. Hojas de Nuestro Ambiente. February 2007: P013. Page 2. Puerto Rico Department of Natural and Environmental Resources. Retrieved 30 October 2011.
 Guia de Saltos y Caidas de Agua de Puerto Rico. Gobierno de Puerto Rico. Departamento de Recursos Naturales y Ambientales. Division del Monitoreo del Plan de Aguas, Secretaria Auxiliar de Planificacion Integral.  San Juan, Puerto Rico. Carmen R. Guerrero Pérez, Secretaria Estatal del Departamento de Recursos Naturales y Ambientales. Edited by Ivelisse Pérez Rodríguez, Nervalis Medina Echevarría, Aurielee Díaz Conde, and Marianela Torres Rodríguez. 2016. 181 pages. Archived.

Rivers, Ponce
 
rivers